Mourning is grief over someone's death. 

Mourning may also refer to:

Music
 "Mourning" (Tantric song), 2001 
 Symphony No. 44 (Haydn), popularly known as Trauer ('mourning')
 "Mourn", a song by Sentenced from the album Frozen

People
 Alonzo Mourning (born 1970), American basketball player
 Mourning Dove (author) (1884–1936), Native American author

See also
 
 In Mourning (disambiguation)
 Morning (disambiguation)